Grünwald (German for green forest) is a municipality in the district of Munich, in the state of Bavaria, Germany. It is located on the right bank of the Isar, 12 km southwest of Munich (centre).  it had a population of 11,303.

Grünwald is best known for medieval Grünwald Castle (Burg Grünwald), the Bavaria Film Studios (one of Europe's biggest and most famous movie production studios), and as a domicile for many prominent and rich people (Grünwald is the wealthiest municipality in Germany). The castle today houses a branch of the Bavarian Archaeological Museum.

For the 1972 Summer Olympics, the municipality hosted the individual road race cycling event. A nearly  circuit to be traversed eight times was used.

Notable residents
 Sophia Flörsch, German race driver
 Robert Freitag, Austrian-Swiss stage and screen actor and film director who was married to German actress Maria Sebaldt
 The Kessler Twins, Alice and Ellen Kessler, German singers, dancers, and actresses
 Carlos Kleiber, Austrian conductor
 Louis X (1495–1545), born in Grünwald, Duke of Bavaria
 Helmut Ringelmann (1926–2011), German film and television producer
 Sep Ruf,  German architect
 Maria Sebaldt, German actress who was married to Austrian-Swiss stage and screen actor and film director Robert Freitag

References